Carouge may be:

Carouge, the city in the Canton of Geneva, Switzerland
Carouge (band)

See also
Carrouge, a municipality in the Canton of Vaud, Switzerland